Wollondilly Anglican College is a Pre-Kindergarten to Year 12 co-educational private school operated by The Anglican Schools Corporation. Located in the Wollondilly Shire, the College services families and communities from areas such as the Southern Highlands, Picton, Camden, Campbelltown and beyond.

History 
Opened in 2004 by former Prime Minister of Australia John Howard, Wollondilly Anglican College began its life teaching students from Kindergarten to Year 7.

The ANZAC Shelter was opened in 2018 by Howard; Brendan Nelson, Director of the Australian War Memorial; Chief of Defence, Air Chief Marshal Mark Binskin; and Brig. General Phil Winter

Buildings & Facilities 
The College buildings are named after famous Christian Australians. These include Joseph Banks, Dame Nellie Melba, Charles Sturt, Elizabeth Macarthur, John Flynn, Captain James Cook, and Alfred Deakin.

Some of the main Facilities within the college include:

 Kitchens
 Workshops
 Art Rooms
 Auditorium
 Dance & Drama Rooms
 Science Labs
 Music Rooms
Senior Campus

College structure 
The College is divided into three main sections which include:
 Junior School (Transition - Year 4)
 Middle School (Year 5 - Year 8)
 Senior School (Year 9 - Year 12}

Houses 
College students are divided into 5 different house groups on enrolment. The house groups are named after native Australian plants. These groups are used primarily for competing in various different sporting events. The house groups are as follows:
 Sollya (Blue)
 Telopea (Red)
 Grevillea (Maroon)
 Wollemi (Green)
 Acacia (Yellow)

See also 

 List of Anglican schools in New South Wales
 Anglican education in Australia
 Sydney Anglican Schools Corporation

References 

Anglican primary schools in New South Wales
Anglican secondary schools in New South Wales
Educational institutions established in 2004
2004 establishments in Australia
Anglican Diocese of Sydney
Southern Highlands (New South Wales)